The New Zealand national junior handball team is the national under 21 men's handball team of New Zealand and is controlled by the New Zealand Handball Federation.

Results

World Championship record

Oceania Nations Cup record

References

External links
Official website
IHF profile

Handball in New Zealand
Men's national junior handball teams
Handball